An exclusive buyer agent (EBA) (also known as an exclusive buyer broker (EBB)) is a U.S. real estate firm (or an agent or broker who works in such a company) that represents only buyers of real estate. EBA firms never take listings and, therefore, never represent the seller in a real estate transaction. 

Exclusive buyer agent firms have chosen this business model in order to eliminate the conflict of interest that exists when one firm attempts to represent both buyer and seller in the same transaction. An EBA or associated broker does not take or hold listings or represent the seller or landlord in any way, nor do the agents working under or for him/her. This includes advertising "for sale by owner" properties. In many states, by law, the broker, or agent must have a written agency agreement to represent the buyer exclusively. Without one, the broker or agent may be working for the seller or in a limited capacity.

History
In 1983, a Federal Trade Commission study revealed that more than 72 percent of home buyers in the United States mistakenly believed that the agent who was showing them homes was representing their interests. As a result, laws requiring agents to disclose whom they actually represent have been passed across the country. As consumers generally became aware that most agents worked for the seller, many began demanding their own representation.

Around the same time, these ideas were being advocated by Honolulu attorney, educator and author of many books, John W, Reilly. His 1987 book "Agency Relationships in Real Estate" was the culmination of several years working with the National Association of Realtors (NAR) and NARELLO the license law arm of the association.

In November 1985 California entrepreneur Ridgely Evers' America's First Home Store opened in Chandler, Arizona, as the first Exclusive Buyer Brokerage in the USA. In 1986 the name was changed to Buyer One and the company had its first public offering. The first national franchise to offer Exclusive Buyer Brokerage was The Buyer's Agent Inc., which was formed in July 1988 by Tom Hathaway, a former state highway patrolman and investigator/compliance officer for the Missouri Real Estate Commission.

Method of exclusive service
Real estate firms in the United States can represent both buyers and sellers in the same transaction, and when representing both, derive profit from both the seller and buyer side of the transaction. While some states have, at the insistence of Realtor trade groups, created various forms of dual agency to allow one company and in some cases an individual agent to represent both sides, other states have continued to hold such practices as illegal. In the opinion of EBAs, it is not possible to faithfully represent the best interests of opposing clients, in the same transaction, simultaneously.

The service structure for EBA real estate practitioners is to show buyers all possible listings from other cooperating brokers as well as all other sources, such as for sale by owners. Then, they assist the buyer with evaluation and negotiation and advocate in the buyer's best interests without restriction.

In their booklet "Shopping for a Home Loan" The United States Department of Housing and Urban Development's (HUD's) settlement cost booklet  (page 6) recommends that home buyers consider using an Exclusive Buyer's Agent in their home search.

EBA firms amount to less than 1/2 of 1 percent of all real estate firms in the US. The EBA business model of unconflicted buyer representation eliminates the possibility of the buyer being confronted with the conflicts of interest which may be associated with the Dual, Limited or Designated Agency business models.

References

External links
National Association of Exclusive Buyer Agents official website  

Real estate in the United States
Real estate in Australia